Olbalbal is an administrative ward in the Ngorongoro District of the Arusha Region of Tanzania. The ward is home to the famous Olduvai Gorge.

In 2016 reports there were 5,387 people in the ward, from 8,969 in 2012, and 7,561 in 2002. The ward has .

References

Ngorongoro District
Wards of Arusha Region